Minnesota State Highway 36 (MN 36) is a  highway in Minnesota, which runs from its interchange with Interstate 35W in Roseville and continues east to its eastern terminus at the Wisconsin state line (near Stillwater), where it becomes Wisconsin Highway 64 upon crossing the St. Croix River at the St. Croix Crossing bridge.  A portion of Highway 36 is a major freeway in suburban Minneapolis – Saint Paul.

Route description
State Highway 36 serves as an east–west route between the cities of Roseville, Little Canada, Maplewood, North St. Paul, Oakdale, Oak Park Heights, and Stillwater.

Highway 36 is a limited-access freeway from its interchange with Interstate 35W in Roseville eastward to Interstate 35E in Little Canada, and about five miles beyond.  The freeway section ends at its signal-controlled intersection with Minnesota State Highway 120 in North St. Paul.  Highway 36 becomes an at-grade expressway at this point.  For about four miles outside of the I-494 / 694 loop, the expressway section of Highway 36 has a speed limit of 65 MPH (105 km/h).

Highway 36 crosses the St. Croix River via the St. Croix Crossing bridge and becomes Wisconsin Highway 64 upon crossing the state line into Wisconsin.

History
State Highway 36 was authorized in 1933.  The route was paved by 1940.

From 1934 to 1982, Highway 36 used to be significantly longer.  The route had turned southward along I-35W, Washington Avenue, and Cedar Avenue in Minneapolis; and connected to what is now State Highway 77 (Cedar Avenue Freeway). In Eagan, old Highway 36 had intersected the Chicago and North Western Railway at-grade, at the Nicols Station Crossing. The section of old Highway 36 that ran along Washington and Cedar Avenues in Minneapolis was returned to county maintenance in 1982, and is currently a section of Hennepin County Road 152.

Highway 36 did not originally reach the Wisconsin state line at the St. Croix River.  Part of old State Highway 212 in Oak Park Heights and Stillwater was renumbered as Highway 36 in 1983.  This section of present-day Highway 36 still carries the old Highway 212 mile markers.

The section of Highway 36 in North St. Paul was closed in 2007 from April to September.  The highway was rebuilt to freeway standards during this time between White Bear Avenue in Maplewood and Highway 120 (Century Avenue) in North St. Paul.  The changes included grade-separated intersections with no interchanges or access within North St. Paul.  The full closure in 2007 allowed the project to be completed more quickly and at a lower cost compared with a staged reconstruction.  It also increased safety for construction workers.  The Highway 36 reconstruction project in North St. Paul was completed in 2008.  The budget of the project was $24 million.

An interchange was constructed in 2014 at Highway 36 and Hilton Trail in Pine Springs. The project also included two roundabouts on Hilton Trail on either side of the highway, one at 60th Street North and another at an extension of Viking Drive.

Prior to August 2017, upon reaching the St. Croix River Highway 36 merged with, and ran concurrent with Minnesota 95 north into downtown Stillwater. At Chestnut St Highway 36 turned east and crossed the St. Croix River on the historic Stillwater Lift Bridge. On August 2, 2017 the new St. Croix Crossing bridge opened and 36 now uses this bridge to cross into Wisconsin, eliminating its concurrency with MN 95.

Major intersections

References

*Adam Froehlig (January 6, 2004). State Highway 36 (photos). Minnesota State Highway Endings. Accessed August 28, 2004.

036
Transportation in Ramsey County, Minnesota
Transportation in Washington County, Minnesota